The 2003 San Miguel Beermen season was the 29th season of the franchise in the Philippine Basketball Association (PBA).

Draft picks

Finals stint
After missing out the finals in the last five conferences, the Beermen made it to the championship playoffs in the Reinforced Third Conference. The Beermen dropped their first five games in the eliminations, playing without an import in their first game before returnee Shea Seals suited up. Seals was replaced by Eric Dailey, who played one game before the Beermen reactivate Seals only to be replaced again this time by former Sta. Lucia import Kwan Johnson, who led the team to their first victory in their six outing, an 85–73 win over Purefoods TJ Hotdogs on September 26.

San Miguel had five wins and eight losses at the end of the elimination round. The Beermen scored a two-game sweep off FedEx Express in the best-of-three quarterfinals and a three-game sweep over Sta.Lucia Realtors in the best-of-five semifinals to make it all the way to the championship series against the Coca-Cola Tigers. The Beermen led 2–1 in the series but lost to the Tigers in seven games.

Occurrences
Center Dorian Peña was suspended for two games during the All-Filipino Cup when he was tested positive of traces of marijuana in a drug test conducted by the PBA.

On June 12, two-time MVP Benjie Paras came out of retirement to sign a two-month contract with San Miguel, only his second team in a 14-year PBA career that started in 1989. The former Shell franchise player announced his retirement earlier in the year.

When Kwan Johnson suffered a groin injury in Game one of the PBA Reinforced Conference finals, San Miguel played importless in the second game of the title series which they lost via rout. The Beermen decided to tap NBA veteran Cedric Ceballos as a temporary replacement in Game three and then opted to stick with Kwan Johnson for the rest of the finals series.

Roster

Game results

All-Filipino Cup

References

San Miguel Beermen seasons
San